Vrabnitsa is a district of Sofia, located in the western part of the Sofia municipality. It has a population of 47,417. It consists of the following neighbourhoods – Moderno Predgradie (meaning Modern Suburb) (Модерно Предградие), Vrabnitsa (Връбница) & Obelya (Обеля).

References

Districts of Sofia